The 2002 Paris Motor Show took place from 28 September to 13 October 2002.

Introductions

Production Cars

 Mercedes-Benz S-Class facelift
 Mercedes-Benz CL-Class facelift
 Citroën C3 Pluriel 
 Peugeot 307 CC 
 Renault Mégane II 
 Nissan Micra
 Porsche Cayenne
 SEAT Córdoba
 Volkswagen Touareg
 Ford StreetKa
 Audi A8
 Toyota Land Cruiser
 Opel Meriva
 Alfa Romeo 147 GTA 
 Honda Accord VII (European Introduction) 
 Bentley Continental GT
 Mazda2

Concept Cars

 Citroën C-Airdream
 Ford Focus C-MAX MAV Concept
 Renault Ellypse
 Kia KCV II
 Opel Eco Speedster
 Mazda6 MPS Concept

See also

 Paris Motor Show

References

External links
Official Website
A-Z Paris Motor Show

Auto shows in France
Paris Motor Show
Paris Motor Show
Motor Show
Paris Motor Show